The National Anti-Corruption Commission, often shortened to the NACC, is an Australian federal integrity commission being established by the Albanese government. The commission is expected to be finalised by mid-2023.

History
Bob Brown called on the Rudd Government in 2009 to establish an integrity commission.  Over the decade since 2012, Australia's score in the Corruption Perceptions Index from Transparency International has slipped from 7th place in 2012 to 18th in 2022.  There is a public perception that corruption in Australia is increasing.  Although every state in Australia had its own anti-corruption agency as of 2017, calls for a federal anti-corruption agency were ignored.  Existing federal agencies that have anti-corruption as part of their remit include the Australian Commission for Law Enforcement Integrity (ACLEI), the Australian Federal Police (AFP), the Australian Public Service Commission (APSC), the Commonwealth Ombudsman and the Australian National Audit Office.  In 2017, a parliamentary committee reported on the establishment of a national integrity commission.  As of 2019, the Labor proposal for a National Integrity Commission does not define corrupt conduct or include a threshold for investigation.  In June 2022, the Attorney-General, Mark Dreyfus, advertised roles in the NACC taskforce.

Abandoned Coalition proposal
In December 2018, the Morrison government proposed a national integrity commission framework. The previous August, Griffith University researchers had laid out a plan for a Commonwealth Integrity Commission, and Attorney-General Christian Porter had been working on adapting the Australian Commission for Law Enforcement Integrity into an anti-corruption watchdog in the Turnbull government. The framework was criticised for its narrow remit and the decision not to allow public hearings, and not being allowed to take tip-offs, as well as the high burden of proof needed before an investigation can take place.  Additionally, ministers would have to agree to allow an investigation into anything they were engaged with.  The Morrison government was critical of the NSW ICAC model.  The Morrison government model also does not give the CIC power to address "grey corruption" such as lobbying, bribery, political donations and the "revolving door".  The Morrison government tabled an exposure draft, but insisted that Labor would have to support it before the government brought it to a vote.  The CIC was not part of the Morrison government's agenda during the 2022 election campaign.

Cathy McGowan's proposal

Senator Larissa Waters amended a plan by former member for Indi Cathy McGowan which passed the Senate in 2018, refining the meaning of corrupt conduct and limiting the retrospective powers of a federal integrity body to 10 years.  It was allowed to lapse in April 2022.

A bill produced by Independent member for Indi Helen Haines to introduce a federal anti-corruption body was blocked in Parliament in November 2021.  Liberal MP Bridget Archer crossed the floor to support it.  By the time Haines introduced the bill, it had been refined by consultation with legal academics, panels of retired judges, civil society stakeholders, ethicists and MPs. It was allowed to lapse in April 2022.  Labor said that it will draw on Haines' bill to inform its legislation, however the NACC has significant differences from Haines' bill.

Introduction into Parliament
The bill's introduction into parliament was delayed by the death of Queen Elizabeth II.  Crossbenchers have proposed that the scope of the NACC should extend to being able to investigate third parties getting in touch with politicians. The bill to establish the National Anti-Corruption Commission passed the senate on 29th of November 2022 after crossbench amendments were either withdrawn or defeated. On the 12th of December 2022 the bill received Royal Assent, the commission is expected to begin operating mid-2023 and the Australian Commission for Law Enforcement Integrity will cease.

Powers
Will be able to investigate Commonwealth ministers, public servants, statutory office holders, government agencies, parliamentarians, and personal staff of politicians  Corrupt non-government actors will not be covered.
Independent of government, with the power to initiate its own investigations as well as in response to tip-offs from referrals, including whistleblowers and the public.
The Commissioner and Deputy Commissioner will serve a single term.
Overseen by a statutory bipartisan Joint Standing Committee of the Parliament.
Has the power to investigate retrospectively.
Has the power to hold public hearings when it is in the public interest, however, the NACC will have private hearings by default.
It will not be able to make a finding of criminality.
Will have the power to investigate Pork barrelling.
It will not have the power to sack parliamentarians.

State anti-corruption commissions
Independent Commission Against Corruption (New South Wales)
Independent Broad-based Anti-corruption Commission (Victoria)
Crime and Corruption Commission (Queensland)
Independent Commission Against Corruption (South Australia)
Corruption and Crime Commission (Western Australia)
Integrity Commission (Tasmania)
Independent Commissioner Against Corruption (Northern Territory)

See also
Corruption in Australia
Australian Commission for Law Enforcement Integrity

References

Further reading

Anti-corruption agencies in Australia
Commonwealth Government agencies of Australia
2022 establishments in Australia
Albanese Government